Carolyn Ellis is an American communication scholar known for her research of autoethnography, a reflexive approach to research, writing, and storytelling that connects the autobiographical and personal to the cultural, social, and political. Her research centers on how individuals negotiate identities, emotions, and meaning making in and through close relationships.

She is a Distinguished Professor Emerita at the University of South Florida.

Awards 
Ellis received the Lifetime Achievement Award in Qualitative Inquiry from the International Center for Qualitative Inquiry in 2012, and a Legacy Lifetime Award from the NCA Ethnography Division in 2013.

Ellis-Bochner Award 
The Ellis-Bochner Autoethnography and Personal Narrative Research Award is given annually by the Society for the Study of Symbolic Interaction affiliate of the National Communication Association for the best article, essay, or book chapter in autoethnography and personal narrative research.

Selected publications
Ellis, C. & Bochner, A (2016) Evocative Autoethnography: Writing Lives and Telling Stories. New York: Routledge
Ellis, C. & Patti, C. (2014). With Heart: Compassionate Interviewing and Storytelling with Holocaust Survivors. Storytelling, Self, Society, 10, 389-414.
Ellis, C. (2013) (director). Behind the Wall. 45 min. film featuring Jerry Rawicki. Warsaw, Poland: Total Film.
Ellis, C. (2009). Revision: Autoethnographic Reflections on Life and Work. Walnut Creek, CA: Left Coast Press.
Ellis, C. (2004). The Ethnographic I: A Methodological Novel about Autoethnography. Walnut Creek, CA: AltaMira Press.
Ellis, C. (1995). The Other Side of the Fence: Seeing Black and White in a Small, Southern Town. Qualitative Inquiry, Vol. 1, 147-167.
Ellis, C. (1995). Final Negotiations: A Story of Love, Loss, and Chronic Illness. Philadelphia: Temple University Press.

References 

Living people
American women social scientists
Communication scholars
American sociologists
American women sociologists
American ethnographers
American non-fiction writers
University of South Florida faculty
American women anthropologists
Year of birth missing (living people)
21st-century American women